Leonardo Azzaro (born 30 May 1978) is a former professional tennis player from Italy.

Career
Azzaro won a silver medal for Italy at the 2001 Mediterranean Games in Tunisia. He defeated Slovenian Marko Tkalec in the semi-final, before losing the gold medal play-off to Konstantinos Economidis of Greece.

The left-handed player appeared in the main draw of three Grand Slams, all in the Men's Doubles, but never made it past the first round. At the 2007 US Open, Azzaro and his partner Filippo Volandri had to face the second seeds, Mark Knowles and Daniel Nestor.

He retired in 2010, having won 20 ITF Futures titles, seven of them in singles, as well as winning 17 Challenger trophies for doubles.

Challenger titles

Singles: (1)

Doubles: (17)

References

1978 births
Living people
Italian male tennis players
Sportspeople from Florence
Mediterranean Games medalists in tennis
Mediterranean Games silver medalists for Italy
Competitors at the 2001 Mediterranean Games
20th-century Italian people
21st-century Italian people